Dou Zecheng (born 22 January 1997) is a Chinese professional golfer. He is from Henan Province. 

As an amateur, Dou represented China at the Summer Youth Olympics, Asian Games, and Eisenhower Trophy in 2014. He won several amateur events and two professional events in China before turning professional in 2014.

Dou won four times on the PGA Tour China in 2016 and won the Order of Merit. He began playing on the Web.com Tour in 2017 and won the Digital Ally Open in July, the first Chinese player to win on the Web.com Tour. He was one of the first Chinese players to earn a PGA Tour card, along with Zhang Xinjun.

In the United States, Dou uses the name Marty.

Amateur wins
2010 National Amateur (China)
2011 Callaway Junior World Championship (ages 13–14)
2012 China National Amateur Winners, Aaron Baddeley International Junior
2013 China Amateur Champions, Volvo China Juniors Match Play Championship
2014 National Team Asia Games and WATC Selecting Event Leg 1

Source:

Professional wins (9)

Korn Ferry Tour wins (3)

Korn Ferry Tour playoff record (0–1)

PGA Tour China wins (4)

Other wins (2)
2012 China National Team Championship (as an amateur)
2013 China Unicom Woo Pro-AM Championship (as an amateur)

Results in World Golf Championships
Results not in chronological order before 2015.

"T" = Tied

Team appearances
Amateur
Bonallack Trophy (representing Asia/Pacific): 2014
Eisenhower Trophy (representing China): 2014

Source:

See also
2017 Web.com Tour Finals graduates
2022 Korn Ferry Tour Finals graduates

References

External links

Chinese male golfers
PGA Tour golfers
Korn Ferry Tour graduates
Golfers at the 2014 Asian Games
Asian Games competitors for China
Golfers at the 2014 Summer Youth Olympics
Sportspeople from Henan
1997 births
Living people
21st-century Chinese people
20th-century Chinese people